Morton is a city in Lewis County, Washington, United States. The population was 1,036 at the 2020 census.

History
Morton was first settled in 1871 by James Fletcher.  It was later named after Benjamin Harrison's Vice President, Levi P. Morton, in 1889.  Morton was officially incorporated on January 7, 1913.  Historic sources of revenue included logging, harvesting of cascara bark, and mining for cinnabar (mercury ore) in local mines.  Morton was once known as the "tie mill capital of the world" in the 1950s.  The longest railroad tie dock in the world ran along the railroad tracks east of Morton.

Geography
Morton is located at  (46.557869, -122.279631).

Climate
This region experiences warm (but not hot) and dry summers, with no average monthly temperatures above 71.6 °F.  According to the Köppen Climate Classification system, Morton has a warm-summer Mediterranean climate, abbreviated "Csb" on climate maps.

Demographics

2010 census
As of the census of 2010, there were 1,126 people, 461 households, and 283 families residing in the city. The racial makeup of the city was 94.2% White, 0.5% African American, 1.2% Native American, 0.6% Asian, 1.8% from other races, and 1.6% from two or more races. Hispanic or Latino of any race were 2.9% of the population.

There were 461 households, of which 26.2% had children under the age of 18 living with them, 43.4% were married couples living together, 11.3% had a female householder with no husband present, 6.7% had a male householder with no wife present, and 38.6% were non-families. 29.9% of all households were made up of individuals, and 17.3% had someone living alone who was 65 years of age or older. The average household size was 2.31 and the average family size was 2.83.

The median age in the city was 46.3 years. 20.3% of residents were under the age of 18; 8.2% were between the ages of 18 and 24; 19.5% were from 25 to 44; 25.8% were from 45 to 64; and 26.2% were 65 years of age or older. The gender makeup of the city was 48.1% male and 51.9% female.

Arts and culture

Festivals and events
The Morton Loggers’ Jubilee is a weekend celebration of the city's history of logging, usually held in August.  The event, proclaimed as the "granddaddy of all logging shows", is highlighted by the coronation of a Jubilee Queen, lawnmower and bed racing, and competitive logging contests. A parade, flea market, live music, and street dance performances round out the festivities.

Politics
Morton has voted Republican in the past, although less so than Lewis County as a whole. The results for the 2020 U.S. Presidential Election were as follows:
 Donald Trump (Republican) -  288 (69%)
 Joseph Biden (Democrat) -  114 (29%)
 Other candidates - 32 (2%)

Education
There are two schools, Morton Elementary and Morton Junior-Senior High.

Centralia College East is adjacent to the Junior-Senior High facility.

Notable people
 Bill Bryant, Seattle Port Commissioner
 Brandy Clark, singer/songwriter for many Nashville recording artists such as LeAnn Rimes and Reba McEntire
Roger "Buzz" Osborne, singer/songwriter/guitarist for the rock band Melvins

References

External links
 Arbor Health (formerly Morton General Hospital)
 Morton Depot Project
 Fire Mountain Arts Council
 Morton Chamber of Commerce
 
 Morton Logger's Jubilee
 Centralia College East

Cities in Washington (state)
Cities in Lewis County, Washington